4-Acetoxy-DET (4-Acetoxy-N,N-diethyltryptamine), also known as ethacetin, ethylacybin or 4-AcO-DET, is a psychedelic tryptamine. It was first synthesized in 1958 by Albert Hofmann in the Sandoz lab.

It is expected that the compound is quickly hydrolyzed into the free phenolic 4-HO-DET by serum esterases, but human studies concerning the metabolic fate of this drug are lacking.

Dosage
4-Acetoxy-DET is orally active, and dosages of 10–25 mg are common. Effects last 4–6 hours.  The free base is also active when smoked in a dose range of 5–20 mg. Smoking 4-acetoxy-DET greatly speeds up the onset; peak effects are experienced within 10 minutes, and are usually over within 1 hour.

Drug prohibition laws

Sweden
Sveriges riksdags health ministry Statens folkhälsoinstitut classified 4-AcO-DET as "health hazard" under the act Lagen om förbud mot vissa hälsofarliga varor (translated Act on the Prohibition of Certain Goods Dangerous to Health) as of Nov 1, 2005, in their regulation SFS 2005:733 listed as 4-acetoxi-N,N-dietyltryptamin (4-AcO-DET), making it illegal to sell or possess.

References

External links
Erowid 4-Acetoxy-DET vault
 Classification document by the Swedish Institute of Health regarding 4-Acetoxy-DET

Acetate esters
Psychedelic tryptamines
Designer drugs
Diethylamino compounds
Substances discovered in the 1950s